Kambiz can refer to
 Kambiz, Iran, a village in Razavi Khorasan Province
 Cambyses (disambiguation)